D211 is a state road in Baranja region of Croatia connecting Baranjsko Petrovo Selo and the D517 state road to nearby border crossing to Beremend, Hungary.

The road, as well as all other state roads in Croatia, is managed and maintained by Hrvatske ceste, state owned company.

Road junctions and populated areas

Sources

State roads in Croatia
Osijek-Baranja County